Rutland is an unincorporated community in Sumter County, Florida, United States. The ZIP Code is 33538, which it shares with Lake Panasoffkee, over nine miles to the southeast.

Geography
Rutland is bordered by the Withlacoochee River to the southwest, Lake Panasoffkee to the southeast, Marion Oaks and rural Marion County to the north, and Wildwood to the east.

Transportation and Economy
The main road through Rutland is State Road 44 which enters Sumter County by crossing over a bridge above the Withlacoochee River. Other roads include County Road 247, and County Road 470. The primary industries are farming and recreation. An airboat tour company is also located in town.

References

External links
Rutland, Florida (MapQuest.com)
Half Moon-Gum Slough Recreational Area (Southwest Florida Water Management District)

Unincorporated communities in Sumter County, Florida
Unincorporated communities in Florida